The Indonesia 2010 census was conducted by Statistics Indonesia in May 2010.

Result

Total population
It found the total population of Indonesia to be 237,641,334 people. Compared to the population in the year 2000 of 206,264,595 people, this is an increase of 31,376,831 people (15.37% in 10 years or an average of 1.54% per year). The data counts 236,728,379 Indonesian citizens (both settled and nomadic) as well as 73,217 foreign citizens residing in Indonesia for at least six months, and 839,730 unaccounted for.

Sex ratio
It found the sex ratio for Indonesia is 101, which means that for every 100 females, there are 101 males. The largest ratio is in Papua with 113, and the smallest is in Nusa Tenggara Barat, with 95 men for every 100 women.

Urbanisation
The statistic shows that about 50% of Indonesia's population currently lives in an urban area, the other half lives in a rural area. Classification is based on a score calculated from the density of population, percentage of households working in agriculture, and availability of city facilities such as schools, markets, hospitals, paved roads, and electricity.

Education
The statistics shows that 5.22% of Indonesia's population have studied postsecondary school, while 9.28% do not go to school at all. Of the primary and secondary schools, about 30% had completed their primary education while 2-% only had some primary education. About 17% each attain a junior or senior high diploma, 1.92% go to vocational school. Of the Indonesians that have attained a postsecondary degree, 1.89% have gained a diploma or equivalent to an associate degree, 3.09% have gained a bachelor's degree, less than half a percent continue onto postgraduate.

Religion

Population Distribution

By island

By province

References

External links
The official homepage of the 2010 Indonesian census
Machine-readable data of the 2010 Indonesian census

Population census, 2010
May 2010 events in Indonesia
Population census
Government of Indonesia
2010 censuses